The Conservative Union (UC) was a Spanish political party created in 1892 by Francisco Silvela as a split from the Liberal Conservative Party.

In 1899 it merged again into the Liberal Conservative Party.

Electoral performance

Restoration Cortes

References

Conservative Party (Spain)
Catholic political parties
Defunct political parties in Spain
Political parties established in 1892
Political parties disestablished in 1899
1892 establishments in Spain
1899 disestablishments in Spain
Restoration (Spain)